Subhash Sharma is a freelance photographer based in Mumbai, India, who specializes in humanistic and documentary photography. His photographs are regularly published in photographic journals, illustrative books  and magazines like TIME magazine USA, Nikkei Japan, Venerdi Italy, The Globe and Mail Canada, Quebec Science, IEEE Spectrum USA, Courrier International Paris, The National Newspaper Abu Dhabi, Hindustan Times, Marwar magazine, G2 magazine, ROUGH Travel Guide to India. His work has been exhibited at LSE.

He qualified as a mechanical engineer then  while studying for an M.B.A. he left to pursue a career as a photographer. His first book was “Digital Glimpses Of India” and his second book “The Land Of  The Holymen“ explores the lifestyle of the Naga Sadhus (Naked saints) Of India. Sharma is inspired by the works of photographers and painters, poets, ancient Indian art and philosophy, and filmmakers.

Awards
2010: CHINA International Press Photo Award.
2008 :  1st prize INDIAN PRESS PHOTO AWARD, sports feature story category.
2006 :  1st prize HUMANITY PHOTO AWARD, CHINA, traditional sports Category sponsored by UNESCO.
2005 :  Merit award, Epson color imaging contest, Japan.
2005 :  2nd place in the United Nations, Switzerland WHO ICF International Photo Contest themed

References

External links
Subhash Sharma's website
Profile at Lightstalkers
videos on YouTube
featured on Travel photographer

Living people
Indian photojournalists
Year of birth missing (living people)